(1915-2001) was an officer and ace fighter pilot in the Imperial Japanese Navy (IJN) during the Second Sino-Japanese War and the Pacific theater of World War II.  In aerial combat over China, the Pacific, and Japan, he was officially credited with destroying eight enemy aircraft.  From 1943 until the end of World War II, Ono specialized in nocturnal interceptions of enemy bombers engaged in nighttime bombing raids.  Ono survived World War II and died in 2001.

References

1915 births
2001 deaths
Japanese naval aviators
Japanese World War II flying aces
Military personnel from Ōita Prefecture
Imperial Japanese Navy officers